Gene and The Gents were a Northern Irish pop showband from Enniskillen, who achieved chart success with tracks including "The Way You Wrinkle Your Nose" and "I Came As a Stranger and Stayed As a Friend" as well as "Puppet on a String".

Early years
The band was founded in 1964, with four members of the Enniskillen-based Skyrockets (Paddy McDermott on tenor saxophone (born in 1940, in Enniskillen, County Fermanagh, Northern Ireland); Dermot Doherty on trombone (born in 1940 in Enniskillen, County Fermanagh, Northern Ireland); Pete Watson on drums (born in 1938, in Enniskillen, County Fermanagh, Northern Ireland) and Henry McCullough on lead guitar. The band was joined by Tony Gallagher on rhythm guitar (born in 1943 in Strabane, County Tyrone, Northern Ireland) and Barry Scully on bass (born in 1944, in County Dublin, Ireland, died 10 December 2007, of a heart attack).

The band advertised for a lead singer and found one in Gene Chetty (born Dushy Anthon Chetty, 2 January 1944, in Durban, South Africa), a Trinity College law student, who had come over in 1962 to study law. He auditioned for the group and got the job. The Gents made their debut on St Patrick's Night, 17 March 1964 at The County Hall in Monaghan. McCullough left in 1966 and was replaced by Pete Cresswell (born Peter Cresswell, February 1944, Kingston-upon-Thames, Surrey) as lead guitarist from London, who originally had played on a hit record in 1961 by Bobby Angelo and the Tuxedos called "Babysitting". McDermott left in early 1968 and was replaced by Mal Kearns on tenor saxophone, vocals (born Malachy Kearns). Barry Scully left in early 1969, and was replaced by Davy Quinn until the band split in April 1969.

Singles

References

 

Pop music groups from Northern Ireland
Musical groups from County Fermanagh
Musical groups established in 1964
Musical groups disestablished in 1969